Stephen Winthrop (20 December 1806 – 25 August 1835) was an English cricketer who was associated with Cambridge University Cricket Club and made his first-class debut in 1829.

References

1806 births
1835 deaths
People educated at Rugby School
Alumni of St John's College, Cambridge
English cricketers
English cricketers of 1826 to 1863
Cambridge University cricketers